The Norwegian Third Division, also called 3. divisjon, is the fourth highest division of the men's football league in Norway. Like the rest of the Norwegian football league system, the season runs from spring to autumn, running approximately from April to October. After the 2010 season, the league was reorganised, reducing the number of teams to 164 and halving the number of parallel sections from 24 to 12. After the 2016 season, the league was again reorganised, reducing the number of teams from 164 to 84, and halved the number of groups from twelve to six.

All six group winners promote to 2. divisjon, while the bottom four in all groups are relegated to 4. divisjon.

History

1963–2010
The 3. divisjon was known as the 4. divisjon from 1963 until 1990, when the top-tier league changed its name to Tippeligaen, the 2. divisjon became the 1. divisjon and the names of all the lower divisions were adjusted accordingly. Until 2010, there were 24 parallel sections of the 3. divisjon, each consisting of between 10 and 16 teams. The winners paired up and played each other in one home match and one away match in a playoff. Thus, 12 teams were promoted to the 2. divisjon. This system was in place from 2001. The number of teams that were relegated from each section to the 4. divisjon, varied from two to four, depending on the number of teams in each section.

2011–2016
From 2011 to 2016, 3. divisjon consisted of 12 parallel sections of 12 or 14 teams, and the winners of each group was promoted to the 2. divisjon. Ten sections consisted of 14 teams each, from the South of Norway, the last two sections consisted of 12 teams each, from the Northern Norway. In the sections with 14 teams, the bottom three teams were relegated to the 4. divisjon, and in the two sections with 12 teams each, the bottom two teams were relegated.

2017–
After changes in the Norwegian football pyramid, no teams were promoted from the 3. divisjon after the 2016 season. The fourth tier was split into six groups which for the 2017 season consisted of the teams finishing from 7th to 14th in the 2016 2. divisjon groups and the top 4 teams from the 3. divisjon groups along with the 8th best 5th placed teams in the 3. divisjon. The rest of the teams in the 2016 3. divisjon was relegated. As of the 2018 season, the 3. divisjon consist of 6 groups of 14 teams

Like in the rest of the Norwegian Football league system, all the teams play each other twice, once at home and once away. Three points are awarded for a win, one for a draw, and if two teams are equal on points, the one with the best goal difference is above the other on the table. The teams are placed in the 12 sections according to geographic considerations.

Current members
The following 84 clubs are competing in the 2023 Norwegian Third Division.

Group 1
Fana
Frigg
Gjelleråsen
Gneist
Grorud 2
Lillestrøm 2
Lokomotiv Oslo
Lysekloster
Os
Sandviken
Skedsmo
Skjetten
Stabæk 2
Ullern 2

Group 2
Brumunddal
Eidsvold Turn
Elverum
Florø
Førde
Fu/Vo
Ham-Kam 2
Hødd 2
Hønefoss
Molde 2
Raufoss 2
Sogndal 2
Spjelkavik
Volda

Group 3
Bjarg
Bremnes
Brodd
Djerv 1919
Eiger
Frøya
Fyllingsdalen
Loddefjord
Madla
Sandnes Ulf 2
Staal Jørpeland
Stord
Vidar
Viking 2

Group 4
Donn
Eik Tønsberg 871
Fredrikstad 2
Halsen
Mandalskameratene
Mjøndalen 2
Odd 2
Pors
Randesund
Sandefjord 2
Sprint-Jeløy
Start 2
Vinbjart
Åskollen

Group 5
Bodø/Glimt 2
Byåsen
Kolstad
Kristiansund 2
Mosjøen
Nardo
Orkla
Rana
Rosenborg 2
Steinkjer
Strindheim
Tiller
Trønder-Lyn
Verdal

Group 6
Asker
Fløya
Follo
HIF/Stein
KFUM 2
Lørenskog
Mjølner
Nordstrand
Oppsal
Sarpsborg 08 2
Skånland
Skeid 2
Skjervøy
Tromsø 2

Reserve teams

Reserve teams of clubs from the two top divisions can participate in the 3. divisjon. Reserve teams of clubs from the 1. divisjon can not play in the 2. divisjon, and can therefore not be promoted from the 3. divisjon.

Sponsorship 
From 2017, 3. divisjon has its title sponsorship rights sold to Norsk Tipping.

Winners

2011–2016

1 Start 2 were not eligible for promotion, runners-up Egersund promoted.

2017–

References

External links

3.division summary(SOCCERWAY)

 
4
Year of establishment missing
Nor
Professional sports leagues in Norway